St. Anselm's Cemetery, Wrought-Iron Cross Site near Berwick, North Dakota, United States, was listed on the National Register of Historic Places in 1989.  It is a historic site within a cemetery that includes wrought-iron crosses.  The NRHP listing included 69 contributing objects.

It includes work by Joseph B. Klein and John Krim, both of Pierce County.  They were among a number of "German-Russian blacksmiths in central North Dakota" who developed individual styles in their crosses and whose "work was known for miles around them."

References

External links
 
 

Cemeteries on the National Register of Historic Places in North Dakota
German-Russian culture in North Dakota
National Register of Historic Places in Pierce County, North Dakota